Gerard Schurmann (19 January 1924 – 24 March 2020) was a Dutch-born British composer and conductor. He lived in the United States from 1981 until his death. He composed music for many film soundtracks. Schurmann was also the orchestrator for the film Lawrence of Arabia. Schurmann died on 24 March 2020 at his home in Hollywood Hills.

Film Music
The Long Arm (1956)
The Man in the Sky (1957)
The Camp on Blood Island (1958)
The Two Headed Spy  (1958)
Horrors of the Black Museum (1959)
Cone of Silence (1960)
Konga (1961)
The Ceremony (1963)
Dr Syn, Alias the Scarecrow (1963)
The Bedford Incident (1965)
The Lost Continent (1968)
Attack on the Iron Coast (1968)
Claretta (1984)
The Gambler (1997)

Discography
Concerto for Orchestra, Violin Concerto
Six Studies of Francis Bacon, Variants for Small Orchestra (1997)
Music for Violin and Piano
Chamber Music, Vol. 2
Chamber Music, Vol. 3
Chamber and Instrumental Music and Songs, Vol. 4

References

External links

1924 births
2020 deaths
People from Java
20th-century British composers
21st-century British composers
British male composers
British male conductors (music)
Dutch emigrants to the United Kingdom
20th-century British male musicians
21st-century British male musicians
British expatriates in the United States